The  is Japanese railway line between  and , all within the industrial area of Fuji in Shizuoka Prefecture. The line does not have any official name. This is the only railway line  operates. The operator company was established on April 1, 2013 as a subsidiary of the former operator , a subsidiary of Fuji Kyuko.

Stations

History
The terminal station of the line was established at Yoshiwara Station on the Tokaido Main Line, and initial plans called for the line to be extended as far as Numazu Station. These plans were delayed by World War II and were eventually cancelled with the end of the war and breakup of the Nissan zaibatsu. The line gained its present name on December 15, 1948, after which regularly scheduled passenger service began. The electric supply for the line was upgraded from 600 Volts to the present 1,500 volts in 1969. In 1984, scheduled freight services past  were discontinued.

All freight services were discontinued on March 16, 2012.

Rolling stock
5000 series(Formerly Tokyu 5000 Series)
7000 series
8000 series
9000 series

References

External links 

  

Railway lines in Japan
Rail transport in Shizuoka Prefecture
1067 mm gauge railways in Japan
Railway lines opened in 1936